Sant Josep (Catalan for Saint Joseph) may refer to:

CB Sant Josep, basketball team based in Girona, Catalonia, Spain
Sant Josep, railway station on the Llobregat–Anoia Line
Sant Josep de sa Talaia, village in the Balearic Islands